The 2014 4 Hours of Red Bull Ring was an endurance auto race held at the Red Bull Ring in Spielberg, Styria, Austria on 19–20 July 2014.  It was the third round of the 2014 European Le Mans Series season and marked the first race following the 2014 24 Hours of Le Mans which many series teams participated in.  This was the first race held at the Red Bull Ring in European Le Mans Series history.

The Signatech Alpine trio of Paul-Loup Chatin, Nelson Panciatici, and Oliver Webb won the race over recent Le Mans class winners Jota Sport.  AF Corse's Matt Griffin, Duncan Cameron, and Michele Rugolo won the LMGTE class for the second time in the season.  SMP Racing scored a one-two victory in GTC with the Kirill Ladygin, Aleksey Basov, and Luca Persiani ahead of their teammates.

Qualifying

Qualifying result

Race

Race result
Class winners in bold.

References

Red Bull Ring
Red Bull Ring